The following outline is provided as an overview of and topical guide to Northern Cyprus:

Northern Cyprus – de facto independent republic on the Mediterranean island of Cyprus. Officially it is the northern territory of the Republic of Cyprus.  The territory includes the Kokkina exclave, a pene-enclave "of" the rest of Cyprus, partly surrounded by sea.

The TRNC declared independence in 1983, nine years after a Greek Cypriot coup attempting to annex the island to Greece triggered an invasion by Turkey. It has received diplomatic recognition only from Turkey, on which it is dependent for economic, political and military support. The rest of the international community, including the United Nations and European Union, recognises the sovereignty of the Republic of Cyprus over the whole island.

General reference 
 Pronunciation: 
 Common English country name:  Northern Cyprus
 Official English country name:  (the) Turkish Republic of Northern Cyprus
 Common endonym(s): Kuzey Kıbrıs
 Official endonym(s): Kuzey Kıbrıs Türk Cumhuriyeti
 Adjectival(s):
 Demonym(s):
 Etymology: Name of Northern Cyprus
 ISO country codes:  See the Outline of Cyprus
 ISO region codes:  See the Outline of Cyprus
 Internet country code top-level domain:  See the Outline of Cyprus

Geography of Northern Cyprus 

Geography of Northern Cyprus
 Extreme points of Northern Cyprus

 Population of Northern Cyprus: 294,906 (disputed)  
 Population density: 86/km2 (223/mi2) (116th)

 Area of Northern Cyprus: 	3,355 km2 (1,295 mi2) (174th if ranked) (2.7% water)
 Atlas of Northern Cyprus

Location 
 Northern Cyprus is located in the following regions:
 Northern Hemisphere and Eastern Hemisphere
 Atlantic Ocean
 Mediterranean Sea
 Cyprus Island (which it shares with the Republic of Cyprus)
 Eurasia (though not on the mainland)
 Europe
 Southern Europe
 Cyprus Island (which it shares with the Republic of Cyprus)
 Mediterranean Basin
 Time zone:  Eastern European Time (UTC+02), Eastern European Summer Time (UTC+03)

Environment of Northern Cyprus 

 Climate of Northern Cyprus

Natural geographic features of Northern Cyprus 

 World Heritage Sites in Northern Cyprus: None

Ecoregions of Northern Cyprus 
Karpaz Peninsula, the area around Cape Apostolos Andreas has been declared as a national park.

Administrative divisions of Northern Cyprus 
 Districts of Northern Cyprus
 Lefkoşa District
 Gazimağusa District
 Girne District
 Güzelyurt District
 İskele District

Municipalities of Northern Cyprus 

 Capital of Northern Cyprus: Nicosia
 Cities of Northern Cyprus: Famagusta, Kyrenia, Morphou, Trikomo

Demography of Northern Cyprus 

Demographics of Northern Cyprus

Government and politics of Northern Cyprus 

Politics of Northern Cyprus
 Form of government:
 Capital of Northern Cyprus: Nicosia
 Elections in Northern Cyprus
 Political parties in Northern Cyprus

Branches of the government of Northern Cyprus 

Government of Northern Cyprus

Executive branch of the government of Northern Cyprus 
 Head of state: President of Northern Cyprus, Derviş Eroğlu
 Head of government: Prime Minister of Northern Cyprus, İrsen Küçük
 List of prime ministers of Northern Cyprus

Legislative branch of the government of Northern Cyprus 

 Parliament of Northern Cyprus (unicameral)
 Assembly of the Republic

Foreign relations of Northern Cyprus 

Foreign relations of Northern Cyprus
 List of diplomatic missions in Northern Cyprus
 List of diplomatic missions of Northern Cyprus

International organization membership 
The Turkish Republic of Northern Cyprus is a member of:
Organisation of Islamic Cooperation (OIC)

Law and order in Northern Cyprus 

 Constitution of Northern Cyprus
 Human rights in Northern Cyprus
 LGBT rights in Northern Cyprus
 Freedom of religion in Northern Cyprus
 Law enforcement in Northern Cyprus

Military of Northern Cyprus 

Military of Northern Cyprus
 Turkish Armed Forces in the Turkish Republic of Northern Cyprus
 Forces
 Army of Northern Cyprus
 Navy of Northern Cyprus
 Air Force of Northern Cyprus
 Special forces of Northern Cyprus
 Military history of Northern Cyprus

History of Northern Cyprus 

History of Northern Cyprus
 Military history of Northern Cyprus

Culture of Northern Cyprus 

 Cuisine of Northern Cyprus
 National symbols of Northern Cyprus
 Coat of arms of Northern Cyprus
 Flag of Northern Cyprus
 Public holidays in Northern Cyprus
 Turkish Cypriot diaspora
 World Heritage Sites in Northern Cyprus: None

Art in Northern Cyprus 
 Television in Northern Cyprus

Sports in Northern Cyprus 

 Football in Northern Cyprus

Economy and infrastructure of Northern Cyprus

Economy of Northern Cyprus
 Economic rank, by nominal GDP (2007): 89th (eighty-ninth)
Currency of Northern Cyprus: Lira
ISO 4217: TRY
 Transportation in Northern Cyprus
 Rail transport in Northern Cyprus

Education in Northern Cyprus 

Education in Northern Cyprus

Airport of Northern Cyprus 
Ercan Airport - http://www.flyercan.com

See also 

Outline of Cyprus

References

External links 

 Official links
Office Of The President, Turkish Republic of Northern Cyprus
Northern Cypriot Tourism Office
TRNC Public Information Office
TRNC Central Bank in Turkish language

 Other links
 ATCA News, Association of Turkish Cypriots Abroad
"Islamic Conference's Parliaments to Call TRNC 'Cyprus Turkish State'" JTW
 Multi-lingial Tourism Portal for Northern Cyprus
Useful Information on TRNC
International Expert Panel for a European Solution in Cyprus
 North Cyprus Tourism Centre
Assembly of Turkish American Associations
Chronology - Cyprus Issue
 Turkish Cypriots of Australia - Historical Book
Münüse, Folk Music
TIKA
EU task-force on Turkish Cypriot community
Northern Cyprus a refuge for British fugitives
Attorney-General v. Ibrahim ("Principle of necessity")
Orams v. Apostiledes (Enforceability in England of Republic of Cyprus Judgment against purchaser of real property in Northern Cyprus; case has been referred to the European Court of Justice for a preliminary ruling)
Caglar v. Billingham (status and taxability of official representative in London of the Northern Cyprus government)

Northern Cyprus